Davide Re (born 16 March 1993) is an Italian male 400 metre runner, two times gold medallist at the 2018 Mediterranean Games. He competed at the 2020 Summer Olympics, in 400 m.

Biography
At the individual senior level, he won a silver medal at 2017 European Team Championships Super League and the gold medal two years later at Bydgoszcz 2019 in Poland.
He has participated in two editions of the World Championships in the 400 metres, reaching the semifinals in both, finishing 23rd overall at London 2017, and 9th overall with a time of 44.85 at Doha 2019, 8 hundredths of a second off his own national record, set at altitude (1000m above sea level) in La Chaux de Fonds, Switzerland three months before.

National records
Outdoor
400 metres: 44.77 ( La Chaux de Fonds, 30 June 2019) - current holder
 Mixed 4 × 400 metres relay: 3:16.15 ( Yokohama, 11 May 2019) (Davide Re, Giancarla Trevisan, Andrew Howe, Raphaela Lukudo) - current holder

Achievements

National titles
 Italian Athletics Championships
 200 metres: 2018
 400 metres: 2017, 2018

See also
 Italian records in athletics
 Italian all-time lists - 400 metres

References

External links
 

1993 births
Living people
Italian male sprinters
Athletics competitors of Fiamme Gialle
Athletes (track and field) at the 2020 Summer Olympics
World Athletics Championships athletes for Italy
Athletes from Milan
Mediterranean Games gold medalists for Italy
Athletes (track and field) at the 2018 Mediterranean Games
Mediterranean Games medalists in athletics
Mediterranean Games gold medalists in athletics
Italian Athletics Championships winners
Olympic athletes of Italy